Michelle Amanda Robinson (née Griffith) (born 6 October 1971) is a retired female English triple jumper who was born in Wembley, Greater London, in the United Kingdom.

Athletics career
Michelle Griffith represented Great Britain at the 1996 Summer Olympics, and England in the triple jump event at the 1998 Commonwealth Games in Kuala Lumpur, Malaysia. Four years later she represented England for a second time in the triple jump at the Commonwealth Games, before appearing for a third time (under her married name, Robinson) during the 2006 Commonwealth Games.

Her personal best jump was 14.08 metres, achieved in June 1994 in Sheffield. In Great Britain, only Ashia Hansen has jumped further.

International competitions

References

External links
 
 

1971 births
Living people
Athletes from London
Sportspeople from Wembley
British female triple jumpers
English female triple jumpers
Olympic athletes of Great Britain
Athletes (track and field) at the 1996 Summer Olympics
Commonwealth Games competitors for England
Athletes (track and field) at the 1998 Commonwealth Games
Athletes (track and field) at the 2002 Commonwealth Games
Athletes (track and field) at the 2006 Commonwealth Games
World Athletics Championships athletes for Great Britain
Competitors at the 1994 Goodwill Games